Eugenio Jáudenes (18 January 1920 – 31 January 2004) was a Spanish sailor. He competed in the Dragon event at the 1968 Summer Olympics.

References

External links
 

1920 births
2004 deaths
Spanish male sailors (sport)
Olympic sailors of Spain
Sailors at the 1968 Summer Olympics – Dragon
Sportspeople from Ferrol, Spain